Palestine–Ukraine relations are bilateral relations between the State of Palestine and Ukraine. The Ukrainian Soviet Socialist Republic recognized Palestinian independence on 19 November 1988. Palestine recognized Ukraine as a sovereign state in February 1992. On 2 November 2001, the two countries established diplomatic relations and the Palestinian embassy opened the same day.

History
The Ukrainian SSR voted in favor of the United Nations plan for the partition of Palestine in 1947.

In April 1999, President Yasser Arafat visited Kyiv and met with President Leonid Kuchma.

In January 2000, Leonid Kuchma, visited the West Bank to take part in the commemoration of the 2000th anniversary of Christianity in Bethlehem, and met with the leader of the Palestinian National Authority (PNA), Yasser Arafat. During an official visit by President Viktor Yushchenko to Palestine in November 2007, an agreement was reached with President Mahmoud Abbas to open a Ukrainian Mission to the PNA.

In November 2014, the Palestinian ambassador to Ukraine, Mohammed Qasem Al-Assad, said of the Palestinian approach to the conflict in eastern Ukraine: "We support the territorial integrity of Ukraine, and we believe that the Donbas was, is and will be a part of Ukraine.

In January 2020, Ukraine withdrew from the Committee on the Exercise of the Inalienable Rights of the Palestinian People (CEIRPP). This decision was approved by Ukrainian President Volodymyr Zelensky.

The Palestinian Authority has not taken a public position on the 2022 Russian invasion of Ukraine. Abbas and most of the Palestinian leadership have elected to remain neutral on the conflict, as they "seek to keep having good relations with both parties". Ukrainian President Volodymyr Zelensky asked Israel for support, stating, "We intend to live, but our neighbors want to see us dead."

See also 
 Foreign relations of Palestine
 Foreign relations of Ukraine

References

External links
 Embassy of Palestine in Ukraine 

Ukraine
Palestine